Znamensky District may refer to:
Znamensky District, Russia, name of several districts in Russia
Znamianka Raion, a former district of Kirovohrad Oblast, Ukraine